Bettotania is a genus of grasshoppers in the subfamily Incolacridinae, not assigned to any tribe.  Species have been recorded from Peninsular Malaysia and Borneo.

Species
The Orthoptera Species File lists:
 Bettotania cinctifemur (Miller, 1935)
 Bettotania festiva (Miller, 1935)
 Bettotania flavostriata Willemse, 1963
 Bettotania maculata Willemse, 1933 - type species
Note: B. asymmetrica Ingrisch, 1989 has been moved to the new genus Asymmetritania.

References

External links 

Acrididae genera
Orthoptera of Malesia